The term Eparchy of Eastern America or Diocese of Eastern America may refer to:

 Serbian Orthodox Eparchy of Eastern America, an eparchy (diocese) of the Serbian Orthodox Church
 Serbian Orthodox Eparchy of Eastern America and Canada, former eparchy (1963-1983) of the Serbian Orthodox Church, in eastern USA and Canada
 Russian Orthodox Eparchy of Eastern America and New York, an eparchy (diocese) of the Russian Orthodox Church Outside Russia
 Armenian Eparchy of Eastern America, an eparchy (diocese) of the Armenian Apostolic Church, under the Holy See of Cilicia
 Assyrian Eparchy of Eastern America, an eparchy (diocese) of the Assyrian Church of the East

See also
Christianity in the United States
Eparchy of Western America (disambiguation)
Eparchy of Canada (disambiguation)